Prospero's Rooms is a single-movement orchestral composition by the American composer Christopher Rouse.  The work was commissioned by the New York Philharmonic, for which Rouse was composer-in-residence, and was completed in 2011. The title comes from the Edgar Allan Poe short story "The Masque of the Red Death," in which the main character Prince Prospero and his fellow aristocrats try to escape the ravages of a plague known as the "Red Death" by locking themselves away from the outside world during a masquerade ball.

Prospero's Rooms had its world premiere on April 17, 2013 at Avery Fisher Hall in New York City, with conductor Alan Gilbert leading the New York Philharmonic; the UK premiere took place at the Barbican Centre in London on April 24, 2015 with Michal Nesterowicz conducting the BBC Symphony Orchestra, with the performance being broadcast live on BBC Radio 3's Radio 3 Live in Concert program.

Composition
On the inception and composition of the work, Rouse wrote in the score program notes:

Instrumentation
Prospero's Rooms is scored for an orchestra comprising two flutes, piccolo, two oboes, cor anglais, two clarinets, bass clarinet, two bassoons, contrabassoon, four horns, three trumpets, three trombones, tuba, timpani, three percussionists, harp, and strings.

Reception
Reviewing the world premiere, Corinna da Fonseca-Wollheim of The New York Times praised Prospero's Rooms, saying, "In Mr. Rouse’s atmospheric work, the story is told with dreamlike speed — 10 minutes from the cadaverous contrabassoon line that opens over quiet string rumblings to the final terrifying crash. Poe’s ball takes place in a sequence of monochrome rooms and the music had a strong sense of motion and spaces being entered and left behind, as well as colors that sometimes seemed eerily disembodied from the instruments that produced them."  George Hall of The Guardian called the work "unmemorable," but nevertheless complimented it as "a lively, if frenetic, piece of orchestral writing."

See also
The Masque of the Red Death in popular culture
Edgar Allan Poe and music

References

Compositions by Christopher Rouse
2011 compositions
21st-century classical music
Compositions for symphony orchestra
Music commissioned by the New York Philharmonic
Music based on works by Edgar Allan Poe
Works based on The Masque of the Red Death